Baijnath Temple (Devanagari: बैजनाथ मंदिर) is a Nagara style Hindu temple situated in a small town of Baijnath located in Kangra District, Himachal Pradesh, India, and was built in 13th Century {1204}by two local merchants named Ahuka and Manyuka. It is dedicated to Lord Shiva as Vaidyanath (Devanagari: वैद्यनाथ), ‘the Lord of physicians’. According to the inscriptions on the present day Baijnath temple structure, a temple of Lord Shiva had existed before construction of present-day structure. The inner sanctum houses a Shiva lingam. Further images are carved in the walls and in niches on the exterior.

Archaeology 
Two long inscriptions are engraved on stone slabs in the main hall. These inscriptions are in Sanskrit written using Sharada script and local Pahari language in Takri script. These inscriptions provide details about the construction of the temple by the merchants Manyuka and Ahuka in Indian national calendar (Saka) in 8th Century. These inscriptions besides praising Lord Shiva, name the current ruler king Jaya Chandra, list of the names of the architects and the names of donor merchants at time of construction. Another inscription names Kangra district's old name i.e. Nagarakot, the district in which the temple is built.

Sculptures 
Numerous idols are carved on the walls of the temple. Some of them dating prior to the present temple was built. Idols include: Lord Ganesha, Lord Harihara (Half Lord Vishnu and Half Lord Shiva), Kalyanasundara (wedding of the Lord Shiva and Goddess Parvati) and defeat of asura Andhaka by Lord Shiva.

Gallery

References

Hindu temples in Himachal Pradesh
Buildings and structures in Kangra district